is a former Japanese football player.

Playing career
Kaneko was born in Kanagawa Prefecture on December 9, 1975. After graduating from Komazawa University, he joined the Japan Football League club Ventforet Kofu in 1998. The club was promoted to the new J2 League in 1999. Although he played many matches as a regular midfielder until 2001, the club finished in last place three years in a row (1999-2001). In 2002, he did not play at all and retired at the end of the 2002 season.

Club statistics

References

External links

1975 births
Living people
Komazawa University alumni
Association football people from Kanagawa Prefecture
Japanese footballers
J2 League players
Japan Football League (1992–1998) players
Ventforet Kofu players
Association football midfielders